Choosoddaam Randi is a 2000 Indian Telugu-language drama film directed by Raja Vannem Reddy and produced by Sunkara Madhu Murali under the Melody Multimedia banner. It stars Jagapati Babu, Srikanth, and Rambha with music composed by M. M. Keeravani. It is a remake of the Tamil film Thai Poranthachu (2000).

Plot
The film begins with Bhimavaram Buchchi Babu / Babu and his sidekick Anji the house-brokers, who make money with their canny personality. Once, a beautiful girl Geeta contacts them when Babu cleverly rents a portion of his house owned by a dangerous goon Tiger Dharma. The purpose of Geeta's visit is to find her lover Aravind, after a lot of struggle she locates him when he seeks some time to convince his parents. Right now, Geeta holds back at Babu's residence. Meanwhile, Dharma is released, who funnily vows not to molest a married woman. To protect Geeta, Babu claims her as his wife which leads to a series of falsehoods. Once, Anji inquires Babu about the reason behind his deeds, then he rearwards. In his childhood, he stayed with his sister Parvati where his brother-in-law Kotaiah despises him. However, Babu dots upon his niece and owes to shield her throughout his life. Unfortunately, he is incriminated and sentenced for a crime. 

Thus, he is winning money either way for his nuptial and fulfilling the niece's aspirations. Here as a flabbergast, Babu discovers Geeta as his niece one that fled from the house because Kotaiah forcibly fixed her alliance with Babu for the property. At that moment, Babu decides to unite Geeta & Aravind without revealing his identity. But to his misfortune, Dharma spots Geeta with Aravind when the hell breaks. So, he necks Babu out and attempts to molest Geeta. Babu recuses her when she understands his virtue and again dwells with him. After crossing many hurdles Babu convinces both the families to knit with Geeta & Aravind. During the time of the wedding, Aravind retorts against Babu and accuses Geeta of being a slut which makes Anji break out the truth. Thereupon, Geeta realizes the righteousness of his uncle and loathes Aravind. At last, it is revealed that Aravind has intentionally falsified himself as an imposter by learning Babu's story. Finally, the movie ends on a happy note with the marriage of Babu & Geeta.

Cast

Jagapati Babu as Aravind 
Srikanth as Bhimavaram Buchchi Babu / Babu
Rambha as Geeta
Kota Srinivasa Rao as Kotaiah
Brahmanandam as Simhachalam
Sudhakar as Anji
Ali as Tirupati
M. S. Narayana
Tanikella Bharani
AVS as Subbu
Giri Babu as Aravind's father
Ponnambalam as Tiger Dharma
Banerjee as a lawyer
K. K. Sarma
Gautam Raju as Hotel server
Jenny
Saadhika Randhawa in item number
Annapurna as Aravind's mother
Rama Prabha as Babu's grandmother
Siva Parvathi as Parvati
Anitha Chowdary as herself
Rajitha
Bangalore Padma as hostel warden
Krishnaveni as Amaravati
Kalpana as Shanti
Kalpana Rai as Kalpana Rai

Soundtrack

Music composed by M. M. Keeravani. Music released on ADITYA Music Company.

References

External links

Films scored by M. M. Keeravani
2000 films
2000s Telugu-language films
Telugu remakes of Tamil films
Films shot in Iceland